Hooligans is a double compilation album of The Who released by MCA Records in 1981. It focuses on Who songs from the 1970s with only the titles "I Can't Explain", "I Can See for Miles" and "Pinball Wizard" from the 1960s. The album reached #52 on the US charts.

It is most notable as the first US album to include three hard to find Who singles. The 1971 UK single "Let's See Action" was not released in the US, and for this album the title was changed to "(Nothing Is Everything) Let's See Action". Two other singles, "Join Together" and "Relay", were released both in the UK and US in 1972. US releases of "Relay" were re-titled "The Relay". The version of the song on this album was edited by use of a fade that occurs about 25 seconds early.

Track listing
All tracks written by Pete Townshend except where noted.

Sales certifications

References

1981 greatest hits albums
The Who compilation albums
MCA Records compilation albums